Weisenburger is a surname. Notable people with the surname include:

Edward Weisenburger (born 1960), American Roman Catholic bishop
Jack Weisenburger (1926–2019), American football and baseball player

See also
 Weisenberger